A bokode is a type of data tag which holds much more information than a barcode over the same area. They were developed by a team led by Ramesh Raskar at the MIT Media Lab. The bokode pattern is a tiled series of Data Matrix codes. The name is a portmanteau of the words bokeh—a photographic term—and barcode. Rewritable bokodes are called bocodes. A bokode consists of an LED covered with a photomask and a lens. Powered bokodes are relatively expensive because of the LED and the power it requires. However, prototypes have been developed which function passively with reflected light like a typical barcode.

Bokodes convey a privacy advantage compared to radio-frequency identification (RFID) tags: bokodes can be covered up with anything opaque, whereas RFID tags must be masked by material opaque to radio frequencies, such as the sleeve provided by the New York State Department of Motor Vehicles when issuing their enhanced state IDs.

References

External links
 
 
 Camera Culture Group
 Didactic article on Bokode "The Future of Barcodes"
 Bokode FAQ

Automatic identification and data capture